John Hamilton Ryley (born 21 December 1961) is a British television producer, and the head of Sky News.

Early life
He was born in Chelmsford in Essex. He is a single child. His father worked for the National Farmers Union (NFU). He is a childhood friend of Charles Moore, of the Daily Telegraph.

He went to Eastbourne College. He attended Durham University (Hild & Bede) from 1981 to 1984, studying Latin, English and Russian Studies. He planned on becoming a barrister. He later attended the Wharton School of Business in 2006.

Career
He was a radio journalist from 1985 to 1987 at Invicta FM in Kent. From 1987 to 1989 he was a news trainee with the BBC, with Jeremy Vine. In late 1989 he worked as a producer on the BBC Nine O'Clock News (the programme moved in 2000). He also worked at The World at One.

ITN
From 1990 to 1992 he was a news producer on the ITV News at Ten, becoming a programme editor from 1992 to 1995.

Sky News

Ryley joined Sky News in 1995. From 1995 to 2000 he was an executive producer, including for Sunrise, then from 2000 to 2006 he was an executive editor.

He has been the head of Sky News since June 2006.

Personal life
He married Harriet Constable in 1987 and they have one son and two daughters. He lives in Witney in Oxfordshire. His wife is a former reporter for Central South.

References

External links
 Speakers for Schools

1961 births
Alumni of the College of St Hild and St Bede, Durham
People educated at Eastbourne College
People from Chelmsford
People from Witney
Sky News
Wharton School of the University of Pennsylvania alumni
Living people